Peebles railway station was the first site of the railway station in Peebles, Scottish Borders, Scotland from 1855 to 1962 on the Peebles Railway.

History 
The station opened on 4 July 1855 by the Peebles Railway. The station was situated on the north side of March Street. A goods shed was adjacent to the station. The goods yard had two sidings, one passing through the shed across March Street and the other stopping short of it. A single road engine shed opened with the line. When the line to Galashiels was planned to be extended, the site of the station would make this difficult so the PR decided that it would be advantageous to build a joint railway station with the Caledonian Railway. Negotiations failed with the CR so they built a new Peebles station to the east of Northgate. The new station still had one platform but it was longer. The new station opened on 1 October 1864 while the old station closed to passengers on the same day although it stayed open to goods traffic. The engine shed was also kept but a new road was added and a turntable was provided to the north. A new siding serving March Street mills was added in 1885. The old Peebles station was referred to as 'old station sidings' until the closure of the line on 5 February 1962. The station was blown down during a storm and the goods shed was demolished afterwards.

References

External links 

Disused railway stations in the Scottish Borders
Former North British Railway stations
Railway stations in Great Britain opened in 1855
Railway stations in Great Britain closed in 1864
1855 establishments in Scotland
1962 disestablishments in Scotland